Hujer is a surname. Notable people with the surname include:

 Flower Hujer (1907–1999), American dancer and modern dance choreographer
 Jiří Hujer (born 1941), Czech luger
 Ludwig Hujer (1872–1968), Austrian sculptor

See also
 CJ Huyer, Canadian singer